Nothing as It Seems is the debut studio album by Canadian pop rock band Wave. The album featured the hit singles "California" and "Think It Over". The album featured guitarists John Pierce and Tim Pierce, drummer Vinny Colaiuta, keyboardist Justin Gray, and producers Ben Dunk and Rick Neigher. The album was among the top 200 best-selling albums of 2001 in Canada. The album was certified gold in Canada in January 2002.

Track listing
"California"
"Daydream"
"Until the Record Breaks"
"Sleepless"
"Read My Mind"
"Think It Over"
"Don't Leave"
"It's a Drag"
"I'd Give Anything"
"Touch"
"With the Stars"
"Clever"

Charts

Year-end charts

Certifications

References

External links
 [ AllMusic.com entry]
 Canoe.ca entry

2001 albums
Wave (band) albums
Warner Music Group albums